The following is a list of characters from the anime and manga series Toward the Terra.

Main characters 

 Jomy, a student born on the Education World of Ataraxia, unknowingly carries the Mu Factor within his genes. On his 14th birthday, he fails his adulthood exam, but is rescued by the Mu from execution. Later on, Jomy's dormant powers awaken, and he is confronted with the realization that he is one of the strongest Mu (a Type-Blue), and the only hope his race has for continued survival.
 Jomy originally rejects the idea of him being a Mu but comes to accept it and succeeds Soldier Blue as their leader. Despite being unnaturally healthy for a Mu, in the original manga his well-being eventually deteriorates to a state that renders him blind, deaf and mute.
In the DVD-only Epilogue episode of the anime, it is shown that in an unknown future Jomy is reincarnated and reunited with Keith on the successfully terraformed Earth.

 Raised in a test tube for the first 14 years of his life, Keith does not remember anything before his non-existent adulthood exam. Labelled as an "android" by Seki Ray Shiroe, he is known for his exceptional mind and elite skills on-board educational station E-1077, on which he befriended Sam. His continued outstanding performance earns him a rapid rise in ranks, and he eventually comes to lead all of Humanity at the young age of thirty.
 Despite being pitted against Jomy and the Mu several times throughout the series, Keith's portrayal is similar to that of an anti-hero and somewhat of a second protagonist, rather than a "villain". His connections and experiences with the Mu ultimately lead him to betray Grandmother, and the SD system itself.
In the DVD-only Epilogue episode of the anime, it is shown that in an unknown future Keith is reincarnated and reunited with Jomy on the successfully terraformed Earth.

 The first leader of the Mu, and the very first Type Blue psion, hence the origin of his name. Having an abnormally weak body, Soldier Blue is reaching his limit in his advanced age, and seeks out Jomy to lead his people, and to ensure the continued survival of the Mu. After 15 years of deep sleep, Soldier Blue unfortunately meets his end in his successful attempt to destroy the Meggido cannon aimed at Nazca by overloading its core with his remaining psionic power, getting vaporized in the overwhelming explosion.

 The very first natural birth since the implementation of the SD system, Tony was born to Mu parents on Naska. He marks the first of several similarly born Mu children who experience rapid growth and possess Type-Blue powers far superior to many of the other Mu. Despite being hot-headed and rebellious, he holds a deep affection for Jomy, calling him "Grandpa" (despite having no relation to him; however, in the movie version, Tony is depicted as Jomy's son).  In the manga, his mother explained to him that Jomy was the "father" of all married couples (in that he allowed the marriages), hence the "Grandpa" nickname.
 Tony's ultimate fate differs in each adaptation.  he succeeds the late Jomy as the leader of the Mu.

 A blind woman who uses Tarot cards to predict the future, Physis is perceived by Blue to be the 'goddess' of the Mu. She is different from other Mu in that she does not carry the necessary mutated gene, and is an otherwise normal human upon whom Blue bestowed psionic abilities.

 A young man with an unwavering loyalty to Keith. Initially believing that his ability to read minds was merely "weird" and "unique", Matsuka is in actuality a Mu who managed to trick the system and pass his adulthood exams without detection. For a time being Matsuka became Keith's personal servant aboard any vessel they were assigned to, using his powers to rescue Keith from any hostile situation involving the Mu. Tragically, Matsuka dies when he saves Keith from an assassination attempt by Tony.

 A young boy unaware of his Mu powers, he is a freshman on-board educational station E-1077 during Keith's senior years. With a fiery, rebellious nature and vehement dislike for the system, he opposes the perfectly elite and poker-faced Keith Anyan, constantly provoking him and striving to surpass him.
 Although Jomy and Shiroe never meet in the manga or its 1980 adaptation, the TV series features an early episode in which Jomy attempts to take the 10-year-old Shiroe back to the Shangri-La with him.

Mu 

 The commander of the Mu mothership, Shangri-La. Despite appearing older than Soldier Blue, they are from the same generation. He's a Type-Green, capable of perfect psionic defense. After years of fleeing the humans and finally arriving on Terra, Harley and the elder Mu sacrifice themselves to allow Physis the chance to escape the collapse of Terra's underground city in the anime television series adaptation.

 A gentle-natured young man born with speech disability, Leo communicates primarily through telepathy. He is one of the first Mu to encounter Jomy, aiding his escape from Ataraxia. Leo dies saving a young human woman from a falling boulder during the collapse of Terra's underground city.

 Tony's mother. She is the first female to give birth naturally after the introduction of the SD system's eugenics program. After Keith stabs the 3-year-old Tony while being held captive on the Mu mothership, Karina is immediately led to believe that he is dead, and she ultimately destroys herself out of her own grief-induced rage.

 One of the naturally born Type-Blue children who possesses remarkable powers like Tony. She is fiercely loyal to Tony and will abide by anything he plans to do. She secretly loves Tony. Artella is killed in battle above Jupiter by Serge Sturgeon's anti-psion defense fighter whilst trying to stop him from killing Tony.

Humans 

 A childhood friend of Jomy, Sam passes his adulthood exam and is placed in the same class as Keith, where the two become close friends. He eventually loses his mind and is reduced to the mentality of an 8-year-old, his mind ironically filled only with the memories of his childhood that repeated memory erasure had forced him to forget. Eventually, he dies from pneumonia after running out in the rain for hours. Keith carries Sam's blood in his earrings.

 Given a bigger part in the anime, Swena was another of Jomy's childhood friends. She is placed in the same class as Keith and Sam on E-1077. She harbors unrequited love for Keith. Swena's biological daughter develops the Mu factor and is rescued by them when Keith tries to kill her as a way of stalling their advance to Terra. In the original manga, she was first seen just before she left E-1077 to get married.

 An anime-only character who also serves as an homage to Serge Battour, the main character of Kaze to Ki no Uta (another of Keiko Takemiya's more famous works). Serge is loyal to Keith - as shown by his grief when he believes that Keith is dead - and often acts as his second in command. He also befriends Matsuka, and is the only person shown to refer to him by his first name ("Jonah"). With his final words Keith tells Serge to look after the human race and work alongside the Mu for a positive future.

Computers 

 The all-powerful computer that governs mankind. It disapproves of the Mu. It was programmed with the prime directive of suppressing the Mu population to prevent it from spreading, and in Keith's words, as a way to direct human hatred toward the Mu and prevent humanity from destroying itself through greed and selfishness.

 A computer deep within Earth that appears after the destruction of Grandmother. Originally installed ten years before the S.D. calendar, its calculations showed a high probability of the Mu deciding Earth's destiny. The politicians of that time disapproved of the calculations and went on to build Grandmother. In the manga, Keith shuts it down after killing Jomy, ending the rule of Superior Domination.

 One of the nine "Terraz Number" and directly connected to Grandmother. Terraz Number 5 is the computer in charge of the awakening ceremony on Ataraxia.

 The mother computer of Educational Station E-1077. She appears as a holographic projection, taking the form of a person familiar to the student. While she acts as counselor, she is in reality in charge of the station, frequently praising and favoring Keith, whom she considers her "child". Eliza and E-1077 are destroyed by Keith when he discovers his origins within the in vitro eugenics program conducted within the station's labs.

Other 

 A creature looks like a purple fox. It communicates with its kind using ultrasound and is capable of limited telepathy. It was created by the Mu, but humans were led to believe that it came from a foreign planet. One specimen communicates with Jomy telepathically at Fantastic Dreamworld, and is freed from its captivity; it follows Jomy to the Mu mother ship later on, and is eventually named "Rain". In contrast, it is also used throughout the TV series as a symbol of Keith and Sam's friendship.

External links
Anime adaptation character bios

References

Toward the Terra